Barthélemy Hervart or Herwart (16 August 1607 - 22 October 1676) was a Huguenot banker.  He saved the French monarchy on several occasions during the Fronde, the series of civil wars in France in the mid-17th century, by means of important loans, and during the period of the fall of Louis XIV's Superintendent of Finance Nicolas Fouquet.

Along with his brother and several other partners, Hervart took part in the financing of the salt marsh drainage project in Arles and Les Baux.

Early life and family 

Hervart's father Daniel Herwart was a Protestant banker from Augsburg who moved to Lyon.

Hervart was married to Esther Vimar in 1697 with whom he had three children: Jean-Antoine Hervart, Anne Hervart, who converted to Catholicism, and Esther Hervart.  Esther married  , and moved to England after he died where she acquired citizenship, remarried, and had five children.

Other Herwart or Hervart family included Barthélemy's ancestor Georg Herwart who was mayor of Augsburg from 1539 to 1548, Georg's son Ulrich, who moved to Lyon, and Ulrich's son Daniel who married Anne Erlin in 1599 and had four children, including Barthélemy.

Career

Arms and military

Initially an arms dealer, Herwart was Army paymaster for Bernard de Saxe-Weimar, a general in the Thirty Years War. This culminated in the signing of the Treaty of Breisach on 9 October 1639, which in turn allowed Barthélemy and his brother Jean Henry to acquire French nationality and land in Alsace at Huningue, as well as the estate at Landser.

Banking 

Following that, the brothers became bankers in Paris.  Barthélemy was Councillor of State in 1649.  His financial support permitted Cardinal Mazarin to overcome his opponents.  Hervart was named Intendant des finances in 1650, and, even though he was Protestant, obtained the post of Controller-General of Finances in 1657.  He retained that position until 12 December 1665.  

After the arrest of Nicolas Fouquet,  gave exclusive authority over his finances to Colbert, as he was already "a member of our council and Intendant of Finances" and made Colbert his Controller-General of Finances a position previously carried out collectively by Louis Nicolas le Tonnelier de Breteuil and Barthélemy Hervart. Breteuil and Hervart were duly compensated for the loss of position.

When Fouquet fell out of favor, Hervart was sued like many financiers, and sentenced to pay a token fine. 
He was also an investor in salt marshes, in a company for the drainage of the marshes of Arles and Baux, and of the French East India Company.

Marsh project funding 

Arles and Les Baux-de-Provence are located in southwestern Provence just north and east of the marshy Camargue region along the Mediterranean.

On 16 August 1642, a contract to drain the marshes was agreed to between the group of Protestant financiers represented by  Dutch engineer : first, the Arles marsh located between Arles and Tarascon, and second, the marsh at Les Baux.

Van Ens was the engineer in charge of the project.  In order to finance the labor, the "Company for the Drainage of the Marshes of Arles and Baux" (Société de dessèchement des marais d'Arles et des Baux) was founded.  Funds were obtained by financiers close to Cardinal Richelieu and Mazarin, including the Hervart brothers Barthélemy and Jean Henry, and Jean Hoeufft.
Other partners included Madame Van Ens (heir of her husband), Octavio de Strada of Dutch origin, Michel Lucas, and Jean François Genoyer.

Jean Henry Hervart took charge of the company at Arles.

On 31 October 1653, articles were drawn up concerning the rules and regulations concerning the drainage operation and covered the management of the work and the responsibility of the associates. It also imposed a requirement to meet yearly on 16 August to "advise and organize the affairs of the company, and to proceed with the nomination of a Director."

Over time, the membership declined.  Van Ens died in 1652. Lucas abandoned his shares to the heirs of Jean Hoeufft, who died before Van Ens, and to the Hervarts in 1659.  Stada died in 1655. By 1659, the company only included the Hervarts, and the Hoeufft heirs.  After the revocation of the Edict of Nantes in 1598, the Hervarts' goods were seized by the King, as they were considered to be religionnaires.  Their goods were only returned in 1692 and only to Catholic heirs residing in France.  Property of Hoeufft's heirs were not affected as he was Dutch, but they were confiscated during the war with Holland, and eventually returned in 1713.  Descendants of Hervart and Hoeufft thus remained the owners of the company during the 18th century.

Death 

Hervart died extremely rich in Paris in 1676, without having been unduly affected because of his Protestant faith.

See also 

 Château de Saint-Cloud
 Thirty Years War
 History of banking

Notes

References

Sources 
 
 
 
 
 
 
 
 

People of the Ancien Régime
1607 births
1676 deaths
17th-century French businesspeople
French bankers